María Udaeta Velásquez is a Bolivian politician.  She served as Minister for Environment and Water in the cabinet of Evo Morales until being replaced by Julieta Mabel Monje in a 2010 reshuffling.

References

Living people
Government ministers of Bolivia
21st-century Bolivian women politicians
21st-century Bolivian politicians
Women government ministers of Bolivia
Year of birth missing (living people)